Ari-Pekka Liukkonen (born 9 February 1989) is a Finnish swimmer and European champion. He competed in the 50 m freestyle event at the 2012 Summer Olympics. He is the Finnish record holder over that distance with a time of 21.58 sec, as well as the short course record in the 50 m.  He also holds the 100 m freestyle record, at 49.44 seconds.  At the 2016 Olympics he swam in the 50 and 100 m freestyle events.

Personal life
On 2 February 2014 Liukkonen came out as gay in an Yle interview, thus becoming one of the first openly gay top-level athletes in Finland.

References

External links 
 
 

1989 births
Living people
Finnish male freestyle swimmers
Olympic swimmers of Finland
Swimmers at the 2012 Summer Olympics
Swimmers at the 2016 Summer Olympics
Swimmers at the 2020 Summer Olympics
Universiade medalists in swimming
Universiade gold medalists for Finland
Medalists at the 2017 Summer Universiade
European Aquatics Championships medalists in swimming
Finnish LGBT sportspeople
LGBT swimmers
Gay sportsmen
People from Pieksämäki
21st-century LGBT people
Sportspeople from South Savo